Dario Caviezel  (born 12 July 1995) is a Swiss snowboarder.
 
He competed in the 2017 FIS Snowboard World Championships, and in the 2018 Winter Olympics, in parallel giant slalom.

References

External links

1995 births
Living people
Swiss male snowboarders
Olympic snowboarders of Switzerland
Snowboarders at the 2018 Winter Olympics
Snowboarders at the 2022 Winter Olympics